Evergreen USA RRG, Inc., is a liability insurance company, that offered liability insurance to privately owned campgrounds, RV parks, resorts, and paddlesport operations throughout the United States.

Privately owned campgrounds are often members of organizations such as ARVC (Association for RV Parks and Campgrounds), Kampgrounds of America, Yogi, Coast to Coast, etc.

Coverages included general liability (business insurance), auto insurance, trailer spotting coverage, directors and officers liability insurance and garage liability.  Evergreen was formed under the Federal Liability Risk Retention Act of 1986  and is a Risk Retention Group.

Currently Evergreen is in run-off and is no longer writing insurance policies and is only handling claims that have incurred on policies which it wrote.

History
In 1989 Evergreen was chartered in Arizona but in 1995 redomesticated to Vermont. Evergreen was started because it was nearly impossible for campgrounds, RV parks and resorts to find insurance in the mid to late 1980s because of the hard insurance market that companies were in as part of the insurance cycle. Richard Hartford began Evergreen USA to help the camping industry.

References 

Insurance companies of the United States
Financial services companies established in 1989
Companies based in Burlington, Vermont